The following table indicates the party of elected officials in the U.S. state of Indiana:
Governor
Lieutenant Governor
Attorney General
Secretary of State
Treasurer
Auditor
Superintendent of Public Instruction (before 2021)

The table also indicates the historical party composition in the:
State Senate
State House
State delegation to the U.S. Senate
State delegation to the U.S. House of Representatives

For years in which a presidential election was held, the table indicates which party's nominees received the state's electoral votes.

1816–1851

1852–present

See also
Politics of Indiana
Elections in Indiana
Government of Indiana
Indiana General Assembly

References

External links 

 Party Control of State Government Over Time – Capitol & Washington

Politics of Indiana
Government of Indiana
Indiana